Ciemino may refer to the following places:
Ciemino, Człuchów County in Pomeranian Voivodeship (north Poland)
Ciemino, Słupsk County in Pomeranian Voivodeship (north Poland)
Ciemino, West Pomeranian Voivodeship (north-west Poland)

de:Ciemino (Główczyce)